Mathew Shon Manweller (born August 23, 1969) is an American political scientist and politician who served as a member of the Washington House of Representatives, representing the 13th Legislative District, from 2012 to 2019.

Education 
Manweller earned a Bachelor of Arts from Whitman College, a Master of Arts from the University of Montana, and PhD from the University of Oregon.

Career 
Manweller worked as a Professor of Political Science at Central Washington University.

During his tenure in the Washington House of Representatives, Manweller was focused on creating a smaller, less expensive, more efficient government that provides solution-oriented leadership. Most recently his efforts prioritized the move against a state income tax, increasing funding for vocational education, reducing forest fires, and preventing school shootings.

During his three terms, Matt Manweller was outspoken about controversial topics such as free speech on college campuses, bathroom bills, and the Washington Supreme Court.

Central Washington University Sex Investigation 
He was initially investigated by CWU in 2012, the year he was first elected to the legislature, on claims of sexual harassment by students while teaching. He obtained a restraining order against the university to prevent release of the 2012 report; the order was lifted four days before election day. In both 2012 and 2013, outside investigators concluded that there was "evidence to suggest" that Manweller violated the university's sexual-harassment policies.

While the university did not punish him following the 2012 investigation, in 2013 Manweller's promotion to full professor was delayed and he was ordered to complete sexual harassment training.

On December 11, 2017, Manweller was placed on administrative leave by Central Washington University, following additional complaints from ex-students. CWU investigated Manweller for "inappropriate conduct." The Seattle Times has additionally reported on a complaint from a Legislative Aide in Olympia, Washington.

On December 14, 2017 Manweller "resigned his leadership position" as assistant floor leader and was " 'removed' from his position as the Ranking Republican on the House Labor and Workplace Standards Committee."

Manweller filed for re-election in May 2018.

Manweller’s employment as a tenured professor was terminated by Central Washington University on August 14, 2018 after an investigation by an independent third party hired by CWU to evaluate accusations of inappropriate behavior made by former students.

On September 21, 2018, Manweller was asked by party leaders to resign his position in the Washington State House of Representatives after it became widely known that he had had a sexual relationship with a 17-year-old girl, a former high school student of his.

In 2019, Manweller settled a wrongful termination lawsuit with Central Washington University for $155,000.

References

1969 births
Living people
Republican Party members of the Washington House of Representatives
21st-century American politicians
People from Ellensburg, Washington